To the Bone is a 1997 Yugoslav action film directed by Slobodan Skerlić.

Cast 
 Lazar Ristovski - Kovac
 Nikola Đuričko - Mali
 Nebojša Glogovac - Simke
 Bojana Maljević - Maja
 Boris Milivojević - Vuk
 Nikola Kojo - Musa
 Goran Sultanović - Miroljub
 Vesna Trivalić - Sveca
 Zoran Cvijanović - Krpa
 Mira Banjac - Sladoledzika

References

External links 

Serbian action films
1997 action films
1997 films
Films about the Serbian Mafia
Yugoslav action films
Films set in Yugoslavia
1990s Serbian-language films